Toufic El Hajj is a Lebanon international rugby league footballer who plays as a  for the American University of Beirut in the Lebanon Rugby League Championship.

Career
El Hajj made his international debut for Lebanon in their 56-14 defeat by Fiji in the 2019 Pacific Test.

References

External links
Lebanon Cedars profile

Lebanese rugby league players
Lebanon national rugby league team players
Rugby league props
Living people
Year of birth missing (living people)